De Palma  is a 2015 American documentary film directed by Noah Baumbach and Jake Paltrow about the director and screenwriter Brian De Palma. The documentary features clips from his films starring various frequent collaborators like  Al Pacino, John Lithgow, Tom Cruise, Sean Penn, Nicolas Cage, Sean Connery,  Michael Caine, John Travolta and various others.

Release 
It had its world premiere at the 72nd edition of the Venice Film Festival, where it screened out of competition.

Critical response

On the review aggregator website Rotten Tomatoes, the film holds an approval rating of 94%, based on 109 reviews, with an average rating of 7.99/10. The site's consensus states: "De Palma may not make believers out of the director's detractors, but they'll likely share longtime fans' fascination with his career's worth of entertaining stories." It has a score of 83 out of 100 on Metacritic.

See also
Vulgar auteurism
New Hollywood
Alfred Hitchcock

References

External links  
 
 
 
 

2015 films
2015 documentary films
American documentary films
Documentary films about film directors and producers
Films directed by Noah Baumbach
Films directed by Jake Paltrow
A24 (company) films
2010s English-language films
2010s American films
Collage film